Al-Taham is a sub-district located in Maswar District, 'Amran Governorate, Yemen. Al-Taham had a population of 4546 according to the 2004 census.

References 

Sub-districts in Maswar District